Poly-Play is an arcade cabinet developed in East Germany in 1985; it is the only such machine to originate in the GDR. It was created by VEB Polytechnik and contained a number of games, including a Pac-Man clone.

A total of about 2,000 units of the cabinet were manufactured.

Hardware 

Poly-Play ran on a U880, a clone of the Zilog Z80 CPU, which was clocked at 2.457600 MHz and a custom sound chip. Its display ran at a resolution of 512*256 at 50 Hz and supported a palette of ten colours, though it could also use coloured overlays. The machine's coin slot was designed for 50 Pfennig, but it was flawed - the pressure sensor could be deceived by pressing a 1-Pfennig coin very sharply into the top of the slot. However, this was largely tolerated because the machine was not a capitalistic commercial venture, but a state-owned product found predominantly in FDGB holiday homes, youth hostels and non-profit clubs. The machine ran with a deactivated coin slot in many youth clubs. However, the free play often caused large crowds to form around it, which incited their reactivation.

A Poly-Play machine was on display in the Museum of Computing in Swindon, England in 2004. From 2005, the same machine was part of the touring video game show Game On and was exhibited in multiple museums, such as the Museum of Science and Industry in Chicago and the Science Museum in London. Two machines can also be seen at RetroGames e.V. in Germany. It is also prominently on display at the Computerspielemuseum Berlin.

Games

The eight aforementioned games were made available to be playable with the emulator MAME in 2000. Additionally, the names of four other games were found in the source code: Der Gärtner (The Gardener), Im Gewächshaus (In the Greenhouse), Hagelnde Wolken (Hailing Clouds, a Space Invaders clone) and Der Taucher (The Diver, a game where malicious fish attack a diver).  All four games have been installed on at least some machines, the same goes for the games Im Irrgarten (In the Maze), Der Lindwurm (The Lindworm), Fly and AFU. Another game titled UFO is actually the original version of Hagelnde Wolken, but was edited due to being deemed too martial by the authorities.

Further reading 
 Mit Pittiplatsch auf Pixelfang In: Süddeutsche Zeitung, 1. Oktober 2007

See also 
BSS 01, the only video game console that was released in East Germany
Polybius, a fictitious arcade game with a similar name.

References

External links
 Andy's Arcade page with many internal views of the surviving cabinets.
 RetroGames e.V. German Club with two working Poly Play machines.
 
 BBC article about Poly Play
 PolyPlay.de - German Website about Poly-Play, here you can play the Poly-Play-Games.
 Poly Play at robotrontechnik.de (in German, with images of all known 17 games)

1985 video games
Arcade video games
Arcade-only video games
Pac-Man clones
Video games about food and drink
Video games developed in Germany
Goods manufactured in East Germany